UDP-N-acetylglucosamine 4,6-dehydratase (configuration-inverting) (FlaA1, UDP-N-acetylglucosamine 5-inverting 4,6-dehydratase, PseB, UDP-N-acetylglucosamine hydro-lyase (inverting, UDP-2-acetamido-2,6-dideoxy-β-L)arabino-hex-4-ulose-forming)) is an enzyme with systematic name UDP-N-acetyl-α-D-glucosamine hydro-lyase (inverting; UDP-2-acetamido-2,6-dideoxy-β-L-arabino-hex-4-ulose-forming). This enzyme catalyses the following chemical reaction

 UDP-N-acetyl-α-D-glucosamine  UDP-2-acetamido-2,6-dideoxy-β-L-arabino-hex-4-ulose + H2O

This enzyme contains NADP+ as a cofactor.

References

External links 
 

EC 4.2.1